The 2006 All England Open (officially known as the YONEX All England Open Badminton Championships 2006  for sponsorship reasons) was badminton tournament which took place at the National Indoor Arena in Birmingham, England, on from 17 to 22 January 2006 and had a total purse of $125,000.

Tournament 
The 2006 All England Open was the third tournament of the 2006 IBF World Grand Prix and also part of the All England Open championships, which had been held since 1899.

Venue 
This international tournament was held at National Indoor Arena in Birmingham, England.

Point distribution 
Below is the point distribution table for each phase of the tournament based on the IBF points system for the IBF World Grand Prix 4-star event.

Prize pool 
The total prize money for this tournament was US$125,000. The distribution of the prize money was in accordance with IBF regulations.

Men's singles

Seeds 

 Lin Dan (champion)
 Bao Chunlai (second round)
 Lee Chong Wei (semi-finals)
 Peter Gade (semi-finals)
 Lee Hyun-il (final)
 Kenneth Jonassen (quarter-finals)
 Chen Hong (quarter-finals)
 Muhammad Hafiz Hashim (first round)
 Wong Choong Hann (third round)
 Ng Wei (third round)
 Kuan Beng Hong (third round)
 Boonsak Ponsana (third round)
 Shon Seung-mo (second round)
 Niels Christian Kaldau (second round)
 Shōji Satō (quarter-finals)
 Sairul Amar Ayob (third round)

Finals

Top half

Section 1

Section 2

Bottom half

Section 3

Section 4

Women’s singles

Seeds 

 Zhang Ning (final)
 Xie Xingfang (champion)
 Wang Chen (quarter-finals)
 Pi Hongyan (semi-finals)
 Huaiwen Xu (quarter-finals)
 Yao Jie (withdrew)
 Mia Audina (semi-finals)
 Tracey Hallam (second round)

Finals

Top half

Section 1

Section 2

Bottom half

Section 3

Section 4

Men's doubles

Seeds 

 Sigit Budiarto / Candra Wijaya (second round)
 Jens Eriksen / Martin Lundgaard Hansen (champions)
 Cai Yun / Fu Haifeng (third round)
 Luluk Hadiyanto / Alvent Yulianto (quarter-finals)
 Mathias Boe / Carsten Mogensen (third round)
 Markis Kido / Hendra Setiawan (second round)
 Chan Chong Ming / Koo Kien Keat (third round)
 Jonas Rasmussen / Peter Steffensen (third round)

Finals

Top half

Section 1

Section 2

Bottom half

Section 3

Section 4

Women's doubles

Seeds 

 Gao Ling / Huang Sui (champions)
 Lee Hyo-jung / Lee Kyung-won (semi-finals)
 Yang Wei / Zhang Jiewen (final)
 Gail Emms / Donna Kellogg (quarter-finals)
 Sathinee Chankrachangwong / Saralee Thungthongkam (second round)
 Chin Eei Hui / Wong Pei Tty (second round)
 Wei Yili / Zhang Yawen (semi-finals)
 Kumiko Ogura / Reiko Shiota (quarter-finals)

Finals

Top half

Section 1

Section 2

Bottom half

Section 3

Section 4

Mixed doubles

Seeds 

 Lee Jae-jin / Lee Hyo-jung (semi-finals)
 Nova Widianto / Liliyana Natsir (semi-finals)
 Nathan Robertson / Gail Emms (final)
 Zhang Jun / Gao Ling (champions)
 Sudket Prapakamol / Saralee Thungthongkam (quarter-finals)
 Xie Zhongbo / Zhang Yawen (quarter-finals)
 Jens Eriksen / Mette Schjoldager (quarter-finals)
 Thomas Laybourn / Kamilla Rytter Juhl (quarter-finals)

Finals

Top half

Section 1

Section 2

Bottom half

Section 3

Section 4

References

External link 
Tournament Link

2006 IBF World Grand Prix
All England Open Badminton Championships
All England Open
All England
Sports competitions in Birmingham, West Midlands
March 2006 sports events in the United Kingdom